Fitzhugh Green may refer to:

Fitzhugh Green, Sr., (1888-1947), author and arctic explorer
Fitzhugh Green, Jr., (1917-1990), an executive with Vicks Chemical Company and then with Life magazine